Sir Philip Despenser, Knt., of Goxhill, Lincolnshire was the son of Hugh Despenser, 1st Earl of Winchester and his wife, Isabella de Beauchamp, daughter of William de Beauchamp, 9th Earl of Warwick and Maud FitzJohn. He was born ca. 1290 in Stoke, Gloucester, England, and died on 24 September 1313. He married Margaret de Goushill, daughter of Ralph De Gousille and his wife Hawise Fitzwarine. Philip was brother to Hugh Despenser the Younger, a favorite of King Edward II.

According to Douglas Richardson's Magna Carta Ancestry, Philip and Margaret were parents to Sir Philip Despenser of Goxhill, Lincolnshire (6 April 1313-August 1349) who married Hon. Joan de Cobham, daughter of John, 2nd Baron Cobham of Kent.

They were parents to: 
 Sir Philip Despenser (6 April 1313-August 1349) who was father to:
 Philip le Despenser, 1st Baron le Despenser (18 October 1342 – 4 August 1401)
 Hawise Despenser (c.1345-10 April 1414), was the 2nd wife of Sir Andrew Luttrell, Lord Luttrell of Irnham by whom she had issue.

References

 Croft's Peerage. Baron le Despenser, [E, 1295 with precedency from 1264]
 Croft's Peerage. Baron Cobham of Kent [E, 1313 - abeyant 1951]

13th-century births
1313 deaths
Philip
Burials at Austin Friars, London
Knights Bachelor
Younger sons of earls